Jamindan, officially the Municipality of Jamindan (Capiznon/Hiligaynon: Banwa sang Jamindan; Aklanon: Banwa it Jamindan;), is a 2nd class municipality in the province of Capiz, Philippines. According to the 2020 census, it has a population of 38,670 people.

Geography

Barangays
Jamindan is politically subdivided into 30 barangays.

Climate

Demographics

Economy

References

External links
 [ Philippine Standard Geographic Code]
Philippine Census Information

Municipalities of Capiz